The THP Orchestra was a 1970s Canadian disco group from Toronto created by European producers Willi Morrison and Ian Guenther. The band released its first album in 1977 and was nominated for a Juno Award for Most Promising New Group. After two releases in two years, the group shortened its name Three Hats Productions to THP and released a third album on Atlantic Records. It disbanded in 1980.

Discography
Albums
Early Riser (RCA, 1976)
Two Hot for Love! (Butterfly, 1977) U.S. #65, U.S. R&B #57
Tender Is the Night (Butterfly, 1978)
Good to Me (Atlantic, 1979)

Singles

Note: "Theme from S.W.A.T." charted at No. 1 in Canada according to RPM.

References

Canadian disco groups
Musical groups from Toronto
Musical groups with year of establishment missing
Juno Award for Breakthrough Group of the Year winners